The third HaSharon Mall entrance suicide bombing was a terror attack  carried out on December 5, 2005 in the HaSharon Mall in Netanya, Israel. Five people were killed in the attack.

The Palestinian Islamist militant organization Islamic Jihad claimed responsibility for the attack.

The attack
On Monday, 5 December 2005, at around 11:30 am, a Palestinian suicide bomber approached the entrance to the HaSharon Mall in the Israeli coastal city of Netanya; he detonated explosives hidden under his clothes when he approached the guards at the entrance for security inspection. Five people were killed in the attack, and more than 40  injured.

The Palestinian Islamic Jihad claimed responsibility and identified the attacker as Lotfi Abu Saada, from the village of Illar in northern West Bank. In response, Israel killed two senior militants in a Gaza airstrike.

See also
 2001 HaSharon Mall suicide bombing
 HaSharon Mall suicide bombing (July 12, 2005)

References

External links 
 Suicide bombing at Sharon Mall in Netanya - published at the Israeli Ministry of Foreign Affairs
 Five die in Israel suicide blast - published in BBC News on December 5, 2005
 At least five killed in Israel suicide bomb attack - published on The Times on December 5, 2005
 Palestinian Bomber Kills Himself and 5 Others Near Israel Mall - published on The New York Times on December 6, 2005
 Five Israelis killed in mall suicide bombing - published on The Daily Telegraph on December 6, 2005

Attacks in Asia in 2005
Mass murder in 2005
Terrorist attacks attributed to Palestinian militant groups
Suicide bombing in the Israeli–Palestinian conflict
Terrorist incidents in Israel in 2005
Shopping mall bombings
December 2005 events in Asia
Netanya
Building bombings in Israel
Islamic terrorism in Israel